Rachel Adler (born Ruthelyn Rubin; July 2, 1943) is professor of Modern Jewish Thought and Judaism and Gender at Hebrew Union College, at the Los Angeles campus.

Adler was one of the first theologians to integrate feminist perspectives and concerns into Jewish texts and the renewal of Jewish law and ethics.  Her approach to God is Levinasian and her approach to gender is constructivist.

Life
After graduating Northwestern University she married  Rabbi Moshe Adler in Chicago in 1965. The couple subsequently divorced.

In 1971, while identifying as an Orthodox Jew (though she previously and later identified as Reform Jewish), she published an article entitled "The Jew Who Wasn't There: Halacha and the Jewish Woman,"  in Davka magazine; according to historian Paula Hyman, this article was a trailblazer in analyzing the status of Jewish women using feminism.

In 1972, she published an article entitled "Tum'ah and Toharah: Ends and Beginnings." In this article she argued that the ritual immersion of a niddah (a menstruating woman) in a mikveh did not "oppress or denigrate women." Instead, she argued, such immersion constituted a ritual reenactment of "death and resurrection" that was actually "equally accessible to men and women." However, she eventually renounced this position.  In her essay "In Your Blood, Live: Re-visions of a Theology of Purity", published in Tikkun in 1993, she wrote "purity and impurity do not constitute a cycle through which all members of society pass, as I argued in my [1972] essay. Instead, impurity and purity define a class system in which the most impure people are women."

In 1983, she published an essay in Moment entitled "I've Had Nothing Yet, So I Can't Take More," in which she criticized rabbinic tradition for making women "a focus of the sacred rather than active participants in its processes," and declared that being a Jewish woman "is very much like being Alice at the Hatter's tea party. We did not participate in making the rules, nor were we there at the beginning of the party."

In 1992, she began a women's Talmud class in her home, teaching the text (in its original Hebrew and Aramaic). This created the first rigorous Talmud study opportunity for lay women outside of New York and Israel.

Adler received a PhD in Religion from the University of Southern California in 1997; her doctoral dissertation was titled "Justice and Peace Have Kissed: A Feminist Theology of Judaism." She is the author of many articles that have appeared in Blackwell's Companion to Feminist Philosophy, Beginning Anew: A Woman's Companion to the High Holy Days, Contemporary Jewish Religious Thought, Lifecycles, The Jewish Condition, and On Being a Jewish Feminist.

Originally a Reform Jew, but converting to Orthodox Judaism in her teens, Adler made her final spiritual home in the Reform movement. On May 13, 2012, she was ordained as a rabbi by the Reform seminary Hebrew Union College-Jewish Institute of Religion in Los Angeles.

In 2013, Adler became the first person to hold the Rabbi David Ellenson Chair in Jewish Religious Thought at Hebrew Union College.

Recognition 
She was awarded the 2000 Tuttleman Foundation Book Award of Gratz College and the 1999 National Jewish Book Award for Jewish Thought by the Jewish Book Council for her book  Engendering Judaism: An Inclusive Theology and Ethics; this was the first time the National Jewish Book Award for Jewish Thought was ever awarded to a female theologian. Among the book's contributions to Jewish thoughts was the creation of a new ritual, brit ahuvim, to replace the traditional erusin marriage ceremony, which Adler viewed as not according with feminist ideals of equality between the sexes. The art exhibit "Holy Sparks", which opened in February 2022 at the Heller Museum and the Skirball Museum, featured 24 Jewish women artists, who had each created an artwork about a female rabbi who was a first in some way. Marilee Tolwin created the artwork about Adler.

See also 
Jewish feminism
Reform Judaism
Role of women in Judaism

References

Sources
Professor Rachel Adler Faculty Page at Hebrew Union College
Rachel Adler Article in Jewish Women's Archive
Adler, Rachel. The Jew Who Wasn't There: Halakhah and the Jewish Woman." Davka (Summer 1971): 7-11.
Adler, Rachel. Engendering Judaism: An Inclusive Theology and Ethics. Jewish Publication Society, 1998

External links
 Jewish Women and the Feminist Revolution from the Jewish Women's Archive
 Articles by Rachel Adler on the Berman Jewish Policy Archive @ NYU Wagner

Living people
American Reform rabbis
Rabbis from Los Angeles
American feminists
Feminist theologians
Jewish American writers
University of Southern California alumni
Hebrew Union College – Jewish Institute of Religion faculty
Jewish ethicists
American Jewish theologians
Reform women rabbis
1943 births
Women religious writers
Women Jewish theologians
20th-century Jewish theologians
21st-century Jewish theologians
20th-century American women writers
21st-century American women writers
Reform Jewish feminists
American women academics
20th-century American rabbis
21st-century American rabbis